The 1990 Princeton Tigers football team was an American football team that represented Princeton University during the 1990 NCAA Division I-AA football season. Princeton tied for second-to-last in the Ivy League.

In their fourth year under head coach Steve Tosches, the Tigers compiled a 3–7 record and were outscored 224 to 168. Mike Hirou was the team captain.

Princeton's 2–5 conference record tied for sixth in the Ivy League standings. The Tigers were outscored 157 to 123 by Ivy opponents.

Princeton played its home games at Palmer Stadium on the university campus in Princeton, New Jersey.

Schedule

References

Princeton
Princeton Tigers football seasons
Princeton Tigers football